TransAsia Airways Flight 235 was a domestic flight from Taipei to Kinmen, Taiwan. On board were 58 people, 15 of whom survived.

Two minutes after takeoff, the pilots reported an engine failure. The aircraft lost altitude, banked sharply to the left and clipped a taxi travelling west on the Huandong Viaduct (causing two more injuries), then the viaduct itself, before crashing into the river below.

Flight 235 was the second fatal accident involving a TransAsia Airways ATR aircraft within seven months; Flight 222 had crashed on  2014, killing 48 of the 58 onboard.

Flight

Flight 235 departed Taipei Songshan Airport at  Taiwan time , for its destination of Kinmen Airport, with 53 passengers and five crew members on board. Shortly after take-off, a fault in the autofeather unit of the number-2 engine caused the automatic take-off power control system to autofeather that engine. The flight crew misdiagnosed the problem, and shut down the still-functioning number-1 engine. The last pilot communication to air traffic control was: "Mayday, mayday, engine flameout." At 10:55, the aircraft crashed into the Keelung River, on the border of Nangang District of Taipei and Xizhi District of New Taipei.

The crash was recorded by dashcams in several cars travelling west along the elevated Huandong Viaduct next to the river. The aircraft, flying level, first cleared an apartment building. Then it rolled sharply, at nearly a 90° bank angle, left wing down. As the aircraft flew low over the elevated viaduct, its left wingtip struck the front of a 2015 Volkswagen Caddy taxi travelling west on the viaduct, and the outboard section of the wing was torn off when it struck the concrete guardrail at the edge of the viaduct. The aircraft continued its roll and struck the water upside down, breaking into two main pieces. The collision with the taxi and the viaduct was captured in footage from a dashcam in a car travelling a short distance behind the taxi, and debris from the plane's wing and pieces of the viaduct's guardrail were thrown across the road surface. Two people in the taxi suffered minor injuries.

At the time of the accident, no adverse weather phenomena were observed.

Aircraft

The aircraft involved in the accident was an ATR 72-600 twin-turboprop, registration B-22816, MSN 1141. It first flew on  2014, and was delivered to TransAsia Airways on  2014. The left Pratt & Whitney Canada PW127M engine was replaced in August 2014.

Passengers and crew
The passenger manifest was composed of 49 adults and four children. Thirty-one passengers were Chinese; many were visitors from Xiamen on a six-day tour of Taiwan. The remaining 22 passengers were Taiwanese.

The flight crew consisted of two pilots, both ranked as captains; the captain was Liao Chien-tsung, 42, with a total of 4,914 flight hours (including 250 hours on the ATR 72) and the co-pilot was Liu Tze-chung, 33, with a total of 6,922 flight hours, including 5,314 hours on the ATR 72. Also, an observer, Hung Ping-chung, 63, was seated in the cockpit jump seat, who had a total of 16,121 flight hours, 6,482 of them on the ATR 72. Two flight attendants were working as cabin crew. All crew members were Taiwanese citizens; the co-pilot was a dual New Zealand–Taiwanese citizen.

Rescue and recovery

Taipei police and fire departments received dozens of calls from eyewitnesses almost immediately after the crash. The Taipei Fire Department, military, and volunteer rescue workers arrived at the crash scene within minutes, and reached the survivors by boat around 35 minutes after the crash. They began removing survivors from the rear section of the semisubmerged fuselage and ferried them to shore in inflatable boats. Divers were forced to cut the seat belts of dead passengers, located mostly in the front section, to remove their bodies. That work was made difficult by low visibility under water.

The aircraft's flight recorders were recovered shortly after  that day. After , cranes were used to lift large sections of the fuselage ashore.

Of the 58 people on board the flight, only 15 survived. One of the two flight attendants, Huang Ching-ya, survived.

Press reports
An unnamed source was reported to have claimed that the pilot had complained of "engine abnormalities" and requested an urgent inspection of the aircraft shortly before its final take-off, but had been rebuffed. This assertion has been denied by both TransAsia Airways and the Civil Aeronautics Administration, the former of whom has released the maintenance records for both powerplants, both propellers, and the airframe.

Reactions

TransAsia Airways 
Following the accident, TransAsia Airways changed its website and social media branding to greyscale images, in mourning for the presumed deaths of the passengers. On , TransAsia retired the flight number GE235, changing it to GE2353.

Taiwan 
The spokesperson of the Office of the President of the Republic of China reported that President Ma Ying-jeou was very concerned about the accident and had given orders to the Executive Yuan and related authorities to provide maximum assistance with the rescue. Immediately after the accident, the president of the Executive Yuan, Mao Chi-kuo, contacted the Ministry of Transportation and Civil Aeronautics Administration to instigate an investigation into the crash, and the minister of national defense to prepare the military for the rescue. The final report on the investigation carried out by Taiwan Transportation Safety Board was released on 30 June 2016.

China 
Over half of the passengers on board the aircraft were Chinese. On  2015, Xi Jinping, the General Secretary of the Chinese Communist Party, released a statement, ordering that accurate information on the aircraft be obtained as quickly as possible, and that "assistance [be provided] in treating the injured". On the same day, Chinese Premier Li Keqiang instructed relevant departments to obtain accurate information from Taipei as quickly as possible.

Investigation
The Taiwanese Aviation Safety Council (ASC) led the investigation into the accident. The French Bureau of Enquiry and Analysis for Civil Aviation Safety (BEA) represented the country of manufacture, and the Transportation Safety Board of Canada represented the country of engine manufacture. Other parties to the investigation included the Taiwanese Civil Aeronautics Administration, the operator (TransAsia), the aircraft (ATR) and engine (Pratt & Whitney Canada) manufacturers, and Transport Canada. According to the executive director of the ASC, Thomas Wang, the aircraft's right engine triggered an alarm just 37 seconds after takeoff. Whereas the crew reported a flameout, according to Wang, data showed the right engine had in fact been moved to idle power. Soon the right engine failed to produce enough thrust for its rotating propeller, lapsing into auto-feathering. A restart was attempted, but the aircraft crashed 72 seconds later.

On , investigators revealed that the left engine, which does not appear to have had suffered a malfunction, had been manually shut off, while cautioning that the investigation was "too early to say if human error was a factor". Investigators released the following preliminary sequence of events:
Without assigning responsibility for the crash, the report confirmed that a still-functional engine number one was incorrectly shut down by the pilot following the failure of engine number two (right engine). The report also stated that the pilot in command had failed to pass a simulator test in May 2014, partly due to his insufficient knowledge about the procedure for handling an engine flameout during takeoff. He retook the test the following month, however, and successfully passed. The ASC released a draft report in November 2015 and published the final version in July 2016.

The final report found that, following the uncommanded autofeather of engine number 2 (right engine), the pilot flying the aircraft reduced power and subsequently shut down the operative engine number 1 (left engine). The flight crew failed to perform the failure identification procedure and did not comply with standard operating procedures. As a result, the pilot flying the aircraft became confused regarding the identification and nature of the propulsion-system malfunction. The autofeathering was caused by compromised soldering joints in the autofeather unit.  During the initial stages of the take-off roll, the flight crew did not reject the take-off when the automatic take-off power control system ARM pushbutton did not light, and TransAsia did not have a clear requirement to do so. The loss of engine power during the initial climb and inappropriate flight control inputs by the pilot flying generated stall warnings and activation of the stick pusher to which the crew did not respond in a timely and effective manner. The loss of power from both engines was not detected and corrected by the crew in time and the aircraft stalled during the attempted restart at an altitude from which they could not recover. Ineffective flight crew coordination, communication, and threat and error management compromised the safety of the flight. The crew failed to obtain relevant data from each other regarding the status of both engines. The pilot flying did not appropriately respond to input from the pilot monitoring.

During the investigation, TransAsia Airways disclosed confidential information from the draft report to Next magazine, which published a story in its issue of 11 May 2016. This was an attempt to influence the investigation into the accident. TransAsia Airways were fined NT$3,000,000 (US$92,000).

Aftermath
Ten pilots who failed the engine-out oral test and a further 19 who did not attend were suspended for one month, pending a retest. TransAsia subsequently demoted one pilot from captain to first officer. Reuters reported that the government ordered all Taiwanese airlines to "review their safety protocols". The Taiwanese CAA announced that it is focusing its attention on TransAsia's training and operations and the country's labor ministry fined the airline for breaches of the labor code over excessive working hours.

On , TransAsia offered NT$14.9 million (about US$475,000) in compensation to the family of each of the dead. This amount includes emergency relief and funeral allowance, totaling NT$1.4M (US$44,300), already paid to each family. Not all of the families have accepted the offer.

The taxi that was struck by the plane has been transported and preserved in an undisclosed museum.

Before this accident, TransAsia Airways Flight 222, which involved another ATR 72-500, crashed during approach due to pilot error. The airline ceased its operations and shut down indefinitely on 22 November 2016.

In popular culture
The Canadian TV series Mayday (also known as Air Disasters and Air Emergency in the US and Air Crash Investigation in the UK and the rest of the world) covered Flight 235 in episode seven of season 17, called "Caught on Tape", which was first broadcast on 19 September 2017 in Australia.

See also 
 List of accidents and incidents involving commercial aircraft

Notes

References

External links

Final report files in English - Aviation Safety Council
 Final report
 Preliminary report
Final report files in Chinese - Aviation Safety Council
 Final report
 Preliminary report
復興航空說明 2015-02-06 1930 版  [Revival Aviation Description 2015-02-06 1930 Edition]  – TransAsia Airways
"News Releases ." Aviation Safety Council
"Flight GE 235 on  2015, ATR 72–600 (72-212A)" (Archive) – Bureau d'Enquêtes et d'Analyses pour la Sécurité de l'Aviation Civile

Multimedia
"復興航空墜機 事件即時統整資訊," [Fuxing Air Crash Event Instant Integration Information] (Archive) Central News Agency (Taiwan), 4 February 2015 – Article showing van and another video of the crash 

2015 in Taiwan
Accidents and incidents involving the ATR 72
Airliner accidents and incidents caused by pilot error
Aviation accidents and incidents in 2015
Aviation accidents and incidents in Taiwan
TransAsia Airways accidents and incidents
February 2015 events in Asia
Airliner accidents and incidents caused by wrong engine shutdown
2015 disasters in Taiwan